The 2022–23 Kategoria e Parë is the 75th official season of the Albanian football second-tier since its establishment. The season began in 3 September 2022 and will end in 6 May 2023. There are 14 teams competing this season. The winning and runner-up teams will gain promotion to the 2023–24 Kategoria Superiore. The promotion play-offs winner will play a promotion play-off match against the 8th ranked team of the 2022–23 Kategoria Superiore.

Changes from last season

Team changes

From Kategoria e Parë
Promoted to Kategoria Superiore:
 Bylis
 Erzeni

Relegated to Kategoria e Dytë:
 Butrinti
 Maliqi
 Pogradeci
 Shkumbini
 Vora

To Kategoria e Parë
Relegated from Kategoria Superiore:
 Dinamo Tirana
 Skënderbeu

Promoted from Kategoria e Dytë:
 Flamurtari
 Luzi 2008
 Oriku

Locations

Stadia by capacity and locations

League table

Results

Positions by round
The table lists the positions of teams after each week of matches.

Top scorers

References

2022-23
2
Albania
Current association football seasons